The scaly-naped pigeon (Patagioenas squamosa), also known as the red-necked pigeon, is a bird belonging to the family Columbidae. The species occurs throughout the Caribbean.

Description 

The scaly-naped pigeon is a large slate grey pigeon (14–16 in), with maroon coloured plumage around the neck. The plumage on the species' nape appears scaly, explaining both the common and scientific names of the species. There is a bare patch of skin which surrounds the birds red eyes; this patch tends to be reddish in males and more yellow in females. The legs and the base of the bill of the species are red, while the remainder of the bill is light coloured.

Distribution and habitat 
The range of the scaly-naped pigeon includes both the Greater Antilles (except Jamaica) and Lesser Antilles. The species tends to occur in rain forests, however it may also be found in drier lowland woodlands; the species is locally common near human settlements. The biodiversity of the species is threatened due to hunting in regions of the Carribean, especially considering their high abundance in Puerto Rico. This species has also declined due to hurricanes, affecting the vegetation and environment of their surroundings, leading to a decline in population.

Behaviour
Scaly-naped pigeons are usually found alone or in small groups. They feed in trees and on the ground and often mix with the rock dove, eared dove and the Zenaida dove. Like most doves they are wary and will flee if they feel in danger.

Reproduction 
The scaly-naped pigeon lays one to two eggs in a nest constructed mostly in trees.

Diet 
The species feeds primarily on the fruits and seeds of trees.

See also

Fauna of Puerto Rico
List of Puerto Rican birds
List of Vieques birds

References

 .
 Rivera-Milán, F., Martínez, A., Matos, A., Guzmán, D., Ruiz-Lebrón, C., Ventosa-Febles, E., & Diaz-Soltero, H. (2022). Puerto Rico plain pigeon, scaly-naped pigeon and red-tailed hawk: population dynamics and association patterns before and after hurricanes.
 F. F., Boomer, Rivera-Milán,G. S., & Martínez, A. J. (2014). Monitoring and modeling of population dynamics for the harvest management of scaly-naped pigeons in Puerto Rico: Scaly-Naped Pigeon in Puerto Rico. The Journal of Wildlife Management, 78(3), 513–521. https://doi.org/10.1002/jwmg.672

External links

Scaly-naped Pigeon videos, images and sounds on the Internet Bird Collection

scaly-naped pigeon
Birds of the Caribbean
Endemic birds of the Caribbean
Birds of Hispaniola
Birds of the Dominican Republic
Birds of Haiti
scaly-naped pigeon